Peter V. Brett (born February 8, 1973) is an American fantasy novelist. He is the author of the Demon Cycle, whose first volume was published in the UK by HarperCollins's Voyager imprint in 2008 as The Painted Man and in the US by Del Rey Books as The Warded Man.

Early life
Peter Brett studied English Literature and Art History at the University at Buffalo, graduating in 1995, after which he spent more than ten years working in the pharmaceutical publication field before writing full-time. He developed an interest in fantasy from an early age.

Career
Brett wrote his 2008 novel The Painted Man (The Warded Man in the US) and much of his second novel on his HP iPaq 6515 while on the New York City subway.

The novel takes place on a formerly advanced civilization world that has now been reduced to a dark age by the attacks of demons known as Corelings. These are powerful beings with magical abilities and differing elemental natures, and each night they emerge from the planet's core to feed on humans, who must take care to be indoors before dark. Against this backdrop the three main characters Arlen, Leesha, and Rojer, pass into maturity and begin individual quests to bring an end to the terror. The book and its sequels have been translated into twenty three languages, including German, French, Greek, Japanese, Russian, Polish, Czech, Spanish, Portuguese, Indonesian, Chinese, Dutch, Korean, Estonian, Turkish, Italian, Serbian, Bulgarian, Hungarian, Romanian, Brazilian Portuguese and Danish.

In The Desert Spear two men are claimed by their own followers to be humanity's prophesied Deliverer. One is Arlen Bales, formerly of a small hamlet who, after many hard lessons, has become the Warded Man (so called because he has covered himself in demon-warding runes). Another contender is a desert warrior, a former friend and betrayer of Arlen, who carries a mystical spear (stolen from Arlen) and heads a vast army intent on a holy war against the demons and anyone else who stands in the way.

Brett's novellas include the 2010 book The Great Bazaar and Other Stories, the 2011 book Brayan's Gold, and the 2014 book Messenger's Legacy.

The Demon Cycle novel has sold over 3.5 million copies worldwide.

Personal life
Brett lives in Manhattan with his wife Lauren and his daughters Cassandra and Sirena. He also enjoys comics and role playing games.

Bibliography

The Demon Cycle
 The Painted Man (UK title; Voyager, 1 September 2008) (US title The Warded Man; Del Rey, March 2009)
 The Desert Spear (Del Rey March 27, 2010)
 The Daylight War (February 12, 2013)
 The Skull Throne (March 31, 2015)
 The Core (October 3, 2017)
Novellas
 The Great Bazaar and Brayan’s Gold (2015)
(Takes place during “The Painted Man”)
 Messenger's Legacy (2014)
(Takes place between “Daylight War” and “The Skull Throne”)
 Barren (2018)
(Takes place during “The Core”, with significant flashbacks to before “The Painted Man”)
Short Story
 Mudboy, included in Unfettered from Grim Oak Press (May 2013) (Included in “Messenger’s Legacy” Novella)

The Nightfall Saga
Set 15 years after The Core
 The Desert Prince (August 3, 2021)
 The Hidden Queen
 TBD

Comic Books
Red Sonja:
 Red Sonja: Unchained, published by Dynamite Comics (March 19, 2014)

References

External links

 
 Video interview on YouTube
 Brett at Fantasy Literature

1973 births
Living people
21st-century American novelists
American fantasy writers
American male novelists
Writers from New Rochelle, New York
University at Buffalo alumni
Writers from Manhattan
21st-century American male writers
Novelists from New York (state)